Sir Thomas Charles Bunbury, 6th Baronet (May 1740 – 31 March 1821) was a British politician who sat in the House of Commons between 1761 and 1812. He was the first husband of Lady Sarah Lennox.

Bunbury was the eldest son of Reverend Sir William Bunbury, 5th Baronet, Vicar of Mildenhall, Suffolk, and his wife Eleanor, daughter of Vere Graham. The caricaturist Henry Bunbury was his younger brother. He was educated at St Catharine's College, Cambridge. Bunbury was returned to Parliament as one of two representatives for Suffolk in 1761, a seat he held until 1784 and again from 1790 to 1812. He was also High Sheriff of Suffolk in 1788.

Bunbury married firstly Lady Sarah, daughter of Charles Lennox, 2nd Duke of Richmond (a grandson of Charles II), and one of the famous Lennox sisters, in 1762. Their notorious marriage, which produced no children (although Sarah gave birth to a daughter by her lover, Lord William Gordon, in 1769), was dissolved by Act of Parliament in 1776 (on the grounds of Sarah's adultery). He married secondly Margaret Cocksedge in 1805. There were no children from this marriage either. Bunbury died in March 1821, aged 80, and was succeeded by his nephew, Henry. Margaret, Lady Bunbury, died in February 1822.

Bunbury was an important figure in the field of horse-racing. His influence has been described as "crucial". He was a steward of the Jockey Club and his horses included The Derby winners Diomed, Eleanor and Smolensko. His racing silks were pink and white stripes.

Notes

References 
Kidd, Charles, Williamson, David (editors). Debrett's Peerage and Baronetage (1990 edition). New York: St Martin's Press, 1990, 

1740 births
1821 deaths
Alumni of St Catharine's College, Cambridge
Baronets in the Baronetage of England
British MPs 1761–1768
British MPs 1768–1774
British MPs 1774–1780
British MPs 1780–1784
British MPs 1790–1796
British MPs 1796–1800
British racehorse owners and breeders
Charles
High Sheriffs of Suffolk
Members of the Parliament of Great Britain for English constituencies
Members of the Parliament of the United Kingdom for English constituencies
Owners of Epsom Derby winners
UK MPs 1801–1802
UK MPs 1802–1806
UK MPs 1806–1807
UK MPs 1807–1812
Chief Secretaries for Ireland